Vladimir Cristi (1880–1956) was a Romanian publicist and politician who served as State Minister in the Nicolae Iorga government between 16 January and 6 June 1932. Cristi was Mayor of Chișinău between 1938 and 1940.

Biography 
Cristi was born in Teleșeu, a village in Bessarabia Governorate, Russian Empire, today in Orhei District, Moldova. He graduated from the Faculty of Law of Moscow University and the Faculty of Agronomy at a university in Paris. In 1917 he was the Gubernian Commissar of Bessarabia. He was deputy in the "Sfatul Țării". He served as Director General for Internal Affairs in Pantelimon Erhan Cabinet and the Daniel Ciugureanu Cabinet. 

In 1944 he fled to Austria where he held the title of minister of cults in the Vienna Legionary Exile Government. Cristi was arrested by the NKVD when he tried to contact Constantin Argetoianu. He was deported to the Soviet Union, and after that he was detained at Văcărești Prison, near Bucharest, where he died in 1956.

Bibliography 
 Figuri contemporane din Basrabia. Enciclopedie, Chișinău, 1939
 Alexandru Chiriac. Mic dicționar al membrilor Sfatului Țării, Patrimoniu, 1992; Dicționarul Membrilor Sfatului Țării 1917–1918. Editura Fundației culturale Române. București.2001

References

 

Romanian people of Moldovan descent
People from Orhei District
1880 births
1956 deaths
Moldovan Ministers of the Interior
Moscow State University alumni
University of Paris alumni
Moldovan MPs 1917–1918
National Moldavian Party politicians
Mayors of Chișinău
Members of the Romanian Cabinet
Expatriates from the Russian Empire in France
Romanian politicians convicted of crimes
Romanian people who died in prison custody
Prisoners who died in Romanian detention
Grand Officers of the Order of the Crown (Romania)